La ciudad no es para mí is a 1966 Spanish comedy film directed by Pedro Lazaga and based on the play of the same name by Fernando Lázaro Carreter published under the pen name Fernando Ángel Lozano. It stars Paco Martínez Soria as Agustín Valverde, an old widower peasant from the Aragonese village of Calacierva who decides to go to Madrid to live with his son and daughter-in-law.

With a budget of 5 million pesetas, it was the highest-grossing Spanish film of 1968 with 65,645,694 pesetas.

Cast 
 Paco Martínez Soria as Agustín Valverde
 Doris Coll as Luciana "Luchi"
 Eduardo Fajardo as Dr. Agustín Valverde II
 Cristina Galbó as Sara
 Alfredo Landa as Genaro
 Gracita Morales as Filo
 José Sacristán as Venancio
 Margot Cottens as Geno
 María Luisa Ponte as Carolina
 Sancho Gracia as Dr. Ricardo Torres

References

External links 

1966 comedy films
1966 films
Films directed by Pedro Lazaga
Spanish comedy films
Films scored by Antón García Abril
Films about internal migration
1960s Spanish films